Heke Peak is a peak  high on the ridge that forms the south wall of Mitchell Glacier near the glacier head, in the Royal Society Range of Victoria Land, Antarctica. It was named in 1993 by the New Zealand Geographic Board after Randal Heke, the foreman of the construction unit which built the New Zealand Scott Base in 1957. He remained in a supervisory role for the management of the buildings for many years until his retirement.

References

Mountains of Victoria Land
Scott Coast